Hymenobacter tenuis is a Gram-negative and aerobic bacterium from the genus of Hymenobacter which has been isolated from a wastewater treatment plant from Korea.

References

External links
Type strain of Hymenobacter tenuis at BacDive -  the Bacterial Diversity Metadatabase

tenuis
Bacteria described in 2017